Fandango Media, LLC is an American ticketing company that sells movie tickets via their website as well as through their mobile app, as well as a provider of television and streaming media information through its subsidiary Rotten Tomatoes.

History
On April 11, 2007, Comcast acquired Fandango, with plans to integrate it into a new entertainment website called "Fancast.com," set to launch the summer of 2007. In June 2008, the domain Movies.com was acquired from Disney.

In March 2012, Fandango announced a partnership with Yahoo! Movies, making Fandango the official online and mobile ticketer for registered users of the Yahoo! service. That October, Paul Yanover was named President of Fandango.

Fandango made its first international acquisition in September 2015 when it bought the Brazilian ticketing company Ingresso, which provides ticketing to a variety of Brazilian entertainment events, including the biannual Rock in Rio festival.

On January 29, 2016, Fandango announced its acquisition of M-GO, a joint venture between Technicolor SA and DreamWorks Animation (NBCUniversal acquired the latter company three months later), which it would later rebrand as "FandangoNOW".

In February 2016, Fandango announced its acquisition of Flixster and Rotten Tomatoes from Time Warner's Warner Bros. Entertainment. As part of the deal, Warner Bros. would become a 30% shareholder of the combined Fandango company. Its stake was reduced to 25% by 2019.

In December 2016, Fandango Media purchased Cinepapaya, a Peru-based website for purchasing movie tickets, for an undisclosed amount. Later that same month, Fandango moved to Fox Interactive Media's former headquarters in Beverly Hills.

On April 20, 2020, Vudu announced it has entered into an agreement to be acquired by Fandango Media. The sale was completed on July 6, 2020.

Services
Fandango's website also offers exclusive film clips, trailers, celebrity interviews, reviews by users, movie descriptions, and some web-based games to Fandango members.

As of March 5, 2015, Fandango provides members the ability to refund or exchange their orders up to 2 hours before the showtime of their film.

Fandango's Android app was listed among Techland's 50 Best Android Applications for 2013.

Competition
Until its acquisition of its rival MovieTickets.com in 2017, Fandango was one of three major online advance movie ticket sale sites, along with MovieTickets.com and Atom Tickets. Before being acquired by Comcast in April 2007, Fandango was privately owned; its major stakeholder, Regal Entertainment Group, which owned the United Artists and Hoyts theater chains, was the second largest movie-theater chain in the U.S. Regal and its partners founded Fandango partly to prevent the older MovieTickets.com from establishing a monopoly on phone and online ticketing services. (MovieTickets.com was publicly owned and traded under the stock symbol HOLL.) The company's advertising agency reportedly chose the name "Fandango" because it sounded "fun, kinetic and smart", and "easily pronounce[d] and remember[ed]--even though it really has nothing to do with movies."

Prior to 2012, Fandango did not provide online ticketing for many AMC Theatres. However, it provided online ticketing for AMC Theatres that were originally part of the Loews Cineplex Entertainment chain, due to contractual obligations in place prior to the 2005 merger of the two movie chains. Loews had previously attempted to break the contract in 2002 under pressure of bankruptcy and from (then) AOL Moviefone and its partner, Loews' Cineplex subsidiary; Fandango successfully sued both Loews and Moviefone and retained Loews' business. As of February 8, 2012, Fandango began providing ticketing for all AMC Theatres in the US, after which MovieTickets.com's fellow shareholders sued AMC for breach of contract. AMC and MovieTickets.com settled in 2013, with an agreement that the theater chain's online ticketing would be available on both Fandango and MovieTickets.com.

In May 2012, Fandango announced a partnership with Moviefone, MovieTickets.com's former partner.

Atom Tickets, a movie ticketing app and website launched in 2014, has been called a "serious competitor" of Fandango's.

Controversies
In July 2009, it was revealed that Fandango and other websites, including buy.com and Orbitz, were linked with controversial Web loyalty programs, also known as post-transaction marketers. Fandango reportedly gave the third party access to Fandango customers' credit cards.

In December 2013, Fandango launched a trademark dispute when WWE tried to trademark the name for use by the professional wrestler Fandango (ne Johnny Curtis).

In August 2014, the Federal Trade Commission (FTC) approved final orders settling charges against Fandango for misrepresenting to the public the security of their mobile app and for failing to protect the transmission of Fandango customers' sensitive personal information. The Fandango mobile app assured consumers, during checkout, that their credit card information was stored and transmitted securely. However, the FTC claims against Fandango focused on failures relating to both the implementation and testing of the Secure Sockets Layer (SSL) certificates for 4 years following the mobile app's launch in March 2009. According to the FTC, Fandango commissioned security audits in 2011, but the audits were limited in scope and did not review the security of the app's transmission of information. The FTC also alleged that Fandango did not implement effective channels for security complaints and instead relied on its general customer service system to handle security vulnerability reporting.

In October 2015, FiveThirtyEight published a story and podcast calling Fandango's metrics on user ratings into question. The investigation noted that the site's method for calculating ratings made it rare for a movie to ever receive an overall rating below three stars. The problem seemingly extended from Fandango's habit of rounding ratings up to the nearest half. Fandango, in response, noted that this was a glitch it was working to repair. Nevertheless, Gizmodo cited the study after Fandango announced the purchase of Rotten Tomatoes amid fears that the purchase would "ruin" the site.

In December 2017, Fandango received hundreds of complaints regarding its delivery of Star Wars: The Last Jedi tickets. Forbes reported that issues began within hours of advanced sales' becoming available for the new Star Wars film, with customers complaining of long wait times and website glitches.

Video on demand
In early 2016, Fandango acquired M-GO, which was re-branded FandangoNOW. Fandango later purchased Vudu in July 2020. FandangoNOW later merged with Vudu on August 3, 2021. Fandango chose to retain the "Vudu" name as it was the larger service with a loyal customer base.

See also
 IMDb
 Roku

References

External links
 

 
2000 establishments in California
American companies established in 2000
Film websites
Internet properties established in 2000
Joint ventures
NBCUniversal
Subscription video on demand services
Ticket sales companies
Transactional video on demand
Warner Bros.
Comcast
Warner Bros. Discovery